Woodland phlox is a common name for several plants and may refer to:

Phlox adsurgens, native to western North America
Phlox divaricata, native to eastern North America